Jean-Robert Gauthier,  (October 22, 1929 – December 10, 2009) was a Canadian politician.

A chiropractor by training, he entered politics as trustee on a local school board. He was elected to the House of Commons of Canada to represent the riding of Ottawa East in the 1972 election as a Liberal Party Member of Parliament. He remained its representative for several decades winning by large majorities each time in the safe Liberal seat.

In 1984, he was appointed opposition whip and became a member of the party's shadow cabinet. His highest profile came during his time as official languages critic for the Liberal caucus, in which Gauthier was a strident defender of official bilingualism. Locally, he was known for campaigning to have an aquarium built in Ottawa. With the Liberal victory in the 1993 election, he ran for Speaker of the House, but lost by one vote to Gilbert Parent.

In 1994, he was appointed to the Senate, where he fought for the rights of French-speaking Canadians. He retired on his 75th birthday in 2004. In the Senate, he listed his Senate division as "Ontario" from November 23, 1994 to December 3, 2001, and as "Ottawa – Vanier" from December 4, 2001 until his retirement.

He was made an Officer of the Legion of Honour by the French Government in 2002. In September 2006, the Jean-Robert Gauthier Catholic Elementary School opened in the Barrhaven district of Ottawa.He was made a member of the Order of Canada in 2007. In 2009, he was made a member of the Order of Ontario.

References

External links
 
 Fonds Jean-Robert Gauthier 

1929 births
2009 deaths
Canadian chiropractors
Canadian senators from Ontario
Franco-Ontarian people
Liberal Party of Canada MPs
Liberal Party of Canada senators
Members of the House of Commons of Canada from Ontario
Members of the Order of Canada
Members of the Order of Ontario
Officiers of the Légion d'honneur
Politicians from Ottawa
21st-century Canadian politicians